Kalyani Assembly constituency is an assembly constituency in Nadia district in the Indian state of West Bengal. It is reserved for scheduled castes.

Overview
As per orders of the Delimitation Commission, No. 92 Kalyani Assembly constituency (SC) is composed of the following: Kalyani municipality, Gayespur municipality and Chanduria II, Kanchrapara, Madanpur I, Madanpur II, Saguna, Sarati and Simurali gram panchayats of Kalyani community development block.

Kalyani Assembly constituency (SC) is part of No. 14 Bangaon (Lok Sabha constituency) (SC).

Members of Legislative Assembly

Election results

2021

2011
In the 2011 election, Ramendranath Biswas of Trinamool Congress defeated his nearest rival Jyotsna Sikdar of CPI(M).

References

Assembly constituencies of West Bengal
Politics of Nadia district